Shea Stadium, formally known as William A. Shea Municipal Stadium, was a multi-purpose stadium in Flushing Meadows–Corona Park, Queens, New York City. Opened in 1964, it was home to the New York Mets of Major League Baseball (MLB) from 1964 to 2008, as well as the New York Jets of the National Football League (NFL) from 1964 to 1983.

The stadium was named in honor of William Shea, who was most responsible for bringing National League baseball back to New York after the Dodgers and Giants left for California in 1957. It was demolished in 2009 to create additional parking for the adjacent Citi Field, the stadium built to replace it and the current home of the Mets.

History

Planning and construction
The origins of Shea Stadium go back to the relocations of the Brooklyn Dodgers and New York Giants in 1957, which left New York without a National League baseball team.

Prior to the Dodgers' departure, New York City official Robert Moses tried to interest owner Walter O'Malley in the site as the location for a new stadium, but O'Malley refused, unable to agree on location, ownership, and lease terms. O'Malley preferred to pay construction costs himself so he could own the stadium outright. He wanted total control over revenue from parking, concessions, and other events.

New York City, in contrast, wanted to build the stadium, rent it, and retain the ancillary revenue rights to pay off its construction bonds. Additionally, O'Malley wanted to build his new stadium in Brooklyn, while Moses insisted on Flushing Meadows. When Los Angeles offered O'Malley what New York City wouldn't—complete ownership of a stadium—he left for southern California in a preemptive bid to install the Dodgers there before a new or existing major league franchise could beat him to it. At the same time, Horace Stoneham moved his New York Giants to San Francisco (although he originally considered moving them to Minneapolis), ensuring that there would be two National League teams in California, and preserving the long standing rivalry with the Dodgers that continues to this day.

In , the National League agreed to grant an expansion franchise to the owners of the New York franchise in the abortive Continental League, provided that a new stadium be built. Mayor Robert Wagner, Jr. had to personally wire all National League owners and assure them that the city would build a stadium.

Soon afterward, Moses and William A. Shea, the New York lawyer who had led the effort to bring National League baseball back to New York, faced a problem. New York state law of the time did not allow cities to borrow money in order to build a stadium. The only way for the city to finance a stadium would be to demonstrate that the stadium could pay for itself. With this in mind, Moses and Shea proposed to have the new team pay substantial rent in order to pay off 30-year bonds. This provision would come back to haunt the Mets years later; they would never live up to that monetary commitment, and the ensuing financial woes would be an albatross around the team for years.

On October 6, 1961, the Mets signed a 30-year stadium lease, with an option for a 10-year renewal. Rent for what was originally budgeted as a $9 million facility was set at $450,000 annually, with a reduction of $20,000 each year until it reached $300,000 annually.

In their inaugural season in 1962, the expansion Mets played in the Polo Grounds, with original plans to move to a new stadium in 1963. In October 1962, Mets official Tom Meany said, "Only a series of blizzards or some other unforeseen trouble might hamper construction." That unforeseen trouble surfaced in a number of ways: the severe winter of 1962–1963, along with the bankruptcies of two subcontractors and labor issues. The end result was that both the Mets and Jets played at the Polo Grounds for one more year.

It was originally to be called "Flushing Meadow Park Municipal Stadium" – the name of the public park within which it was built – but an ultimately successful movement was launched to name it in honor of Shea.

Opening
After 29 months of construction and $28.5 million spent, Shea Stadium opened on April 17, 1964, with the Pittsburgh Pirates beating the Mets  before a crowd of  There were no prior exhibition games or events, and the stadium was barely finished in time for the home opener. Because of a jurisdictional dispute between Local 3 of the International Brotherhood of Electrical Workers and Local 1106 of the Communications Workers of America, the telephone and telegraph wiring was not finished in time for opening day. The stadium opened five days before the 1964-65 New York World's Fair, across Roosevelt Avenue. Although not officially part of the fair grounds, the stadium sported steel panels on its exterior in the blue-and-orange colors of the Fair, the same team colors of the Mets. The panels were removed in 1980.

Demolition

In accordance with New York City law, in 2009 Shea Stadium was dismantled, rather than imploded. The company with the rights to sell memorabilia was given two weeks after the final game to remove seats, signage and other potentially saleable and collectable items before demolition was to begin. The seats were the first ($869 per pair plus tax, a combination of '86 and '69, the team's two World Series championship years), followed by other memorabilia such as the foul poles, dugouts, stadium signage, and the giant letters that spelled out "SHEA" at the front of the building.

After salvaging operations concluded, demolition of the ballpark began on October 14, 2008. On October 18, the scoreboard in right field was demolished, with the bleachers, batter's eye and bullpens shortly thereafter.

By November 10, the field, dugouts and the rest of the field level seats had been demolished.

On January 31, Mets fans all over New York came to Shea Stadium for one final farewell. Fans took a tour of the site, told stories, and sang songs. The last remaining section of seats was demolished on February 18. Fans stood in awe as the remaining structure of Shea Stadium (one section of ramps) was torn down at 11:22 am.

The locations of Shea's home plate, pitcher's mound, and bases are marked in Citi Field's parking lot. The plaques feature engravings of the neon baseball players that graced the exterior of the stadium from 1988 onward.

Redevelopment
On October 9, 2013, the New York City Council approved a plan to build a mall and entertainment center called Willets West in the Citi Field parking lot where Shea Stadium stood, as part of an effort by the city to redevelop the nearby neighborhood of Willets Point. However, in 2015, the Appellate Division of the New York State Supreme Court ruled that the site, considered parkland, could not be used for commercial development without permission from the New York state government.
 
In 2022, Mets owner Steve Cohen was pushing to build a casino in the parking lot, which was supported by New York City mayor Eric Adams, but still needs final approval from New York State.

Stadium usage

Baseball

Shea Stadium was the home of the New York Mets starting in 1964, and it hosted what would be its only All-Star Game that first year, with Johnny Callison of the Philadelphia Phillies hitting a home run in the ninth inning to win the only Mid-Summer Classic held in the Queens ballpark. A month earlier, on Father's Day, Callison's teammate, future Hall of Fame member and U.S. Senator Jim Bunning, pitched a perfect game against the Mets.

The stadium was often criticized by baseball purists for many reasons, even though it was retrofitted to be a baseball-only stadium after the Jets left. The upper deck was one of the highest in the majors. The lower boxes were farther from the field than similar seats in other parks because they were still on the rails that had swiveled them into position for football. Outfield seating was sparse, in part because the stadium was designed to be fully enclosed.

At one time, Shea's foul territory was one of the most expansive in the majors. This was very common for ballparks built during the 1960s, in part due to the need to accommodate the larger football field. This was also because the stadium was designed to be fully enclosed. However, seats added over the years in the lower level greatly reduced the size of foul territory by the dawn of the 21st century. On the plus side, Shea always used a natural grass surface, in contrast to other multi-purpose stadiums such as Three Rivers Stadium, Veterans Stadium, and Riverfront Stadium, which were built in the same era and style and had artificial turf.

It had the distinction of being the home of the 1969 "Miracle Mets"— led by former Brooklyn Dodger Gil Hodges that defied 100–1 odds and won the World Series, after seven straight seasons in last or next-to-last place. Shea became famous for the bedlam that took place after the Mets won the decisive Game 5 of the World Series, as fans stormed the field in celebration. Similar scenes took place a few weeks earlier after the Mets clinched the National League East title, and then defeated the Atlanta Braves in the first National League Championship Series to win the pennant.

Tommie Agee, Lenny Dykstra, Todd Pratt, Robin Ventura, and Benny Agbayani hit post-season, walk-off home runs at Shea (although, while the ball hit by Ventura over the fence may have been the most famous of the postseason walk-off hits, it was famously called "the Grand Slam Single", because when he hit the game-winning ball over the fence, he was mobbed by his teammates before he could reach second base, and never wound up touching second base, third base and home plate. It was not ruled a home run as he never circled the bases completely. It probably made Ventura, known for his penchant for hitting grand slams, even more famous, and the hit itself more famous, because of the very fact that he never circled the bases fully, technically not making it a homer).

Agee was the only player in the history of the ballpark to hit a fair ball into the upper deck in left field. The spot was marked with a sign featuring Agee's number 20 and the date, which was April 10, 1969. Teammate Cleon Jones said the ball was still rising when it hit the seats, so it very likely could have been the longest home run hit at Shea. It came in the second inning, and Agee hit another in the seventh over the center field wall; both solo shots were off of Montreal Expos starter Larry Jaster, and the Mets 

In 1971, Dave Kingman – then with the San Francisco Giants and later to play for the Mets on two occasions – hit a home run that smashed off the windshield of the Giants' team bus, parked behind the left field bullpen.

For many years, the Mets' theme song, "Meet the Mets", was played at Shea before every home game. Jane Jarvis, a local jazz artist, played the popular songs on the Thomas organ at Mets games for many years at the stadium.

On October 3, 2004, it was the venue for the last game in the history of the Montreal Expos, and the Mets won  Montreal's major league story ended where it had started 35 years earlier: at Shea Stadium. The following year, the Expos relocated to Washington, D.C. and became the Nationals.

The last game played at Shea Stadium was a loss to the Florida Marlins on September 28, 2008. However, the Mets were in the thick of the playoff chase until the last day. A win would have meant another game for Shea as the Mets were scheduled to play the Milwaukee Brewers in a one-game playoff for the National League Wild Card berth. Following the game, there was a "Shea Goodbye" tribute in which many players from the Mets' glory years entered the stadium and touched home plate one final time so that fans could pay their last respects to the players and the stadium the Mets called home for 45 years. The ceremony ended with Tom Seaver throwing a final pitch to Mike Piazza, then, as the Beatles' "In My Life" played on the stadium speakers the two former Met stars walked out of the centerfield gate and closed it behind them, followed by a display of blue and orange fireworks.

Three National League Division Series were played at Shea Stadium. The Mets won all three, and never lost a Division Series game at Shea.
1999 against the Arizona Diamondbacks – Mets won 3 games to 1
2000 against the San Francisco Giants – Mets won 3 games to 1
2006 against the Los Angeles Dodgers – Mets won 3 games to 0

Seven National League Championship Series were played at Shea Stadium.
1969 against the Atlanta Braves – Mets won 3 games to 0
1973 against the Cincinnati Reds – Mets won 3 games to 2
1986 against the Houston Astros – Mets won 4 games to 2
1988 against the Los Angeles Dodgers – Dodgers won 4 games to 3
1999 against the Atlanta Braves – Braves won 4 games to 2
2000 against the St. Louis Cardinals – Mets won 4 games to 1
2006 against the St. Louis Cardinals – Cardinals won 4 games to 3

The decisive seventh game of this series was played at Shea Stadium, marking the only time that the Mets lost the deciding game of a National League Championship Series at Shea.

Four World Series were played in Shea Stadium.
 against the Baltimore Orioles – Mets won 4 games to 1
 against the Oakland Athletics – A's won 4 games to 3
 against the Boston Red Sox – Mets won 4 games to 3
 against the New York Yankees – Yankees won 4 games to 1

The Yankees' World Series win in 2000 was the only time that a visiting team won a World Series at Shea Stadium. The Mets won both their World Series titles at Shea Stadium (in Game 5 in 1969, and Game 7 in 1986).

The New York Yankees played their home games in Shea Stadium during the 1974 and 1975 seasons while Yankee Stadium was being renovated. The move to Shea had been proposed earlier in the decade, but the Mets, as Shea's primary tenants, refused to sign off on the deal. However, when the city stepped in to pay for renovating Yankee Stadium, the Mets had little choice but to agree to share Shea with the Yankees.

On the afternoon of April 15, 1998, the Yankees also played one home game at Shea, against the Anaheim Angels after a beam collapsed at Yankee Stadium two days before, destroying several rows of seats. With the Mets playing a game at Shea that evening against the Chicago Cubs, the Yankees used the visitor's locker room and dugout and the Angels used the home dugout and old locker room of the New York Jets. Former Mets star Darryl Strawberry, then playing for the Yankees, hit a home run during the game. Stadium operators partially raised the Mets' home run apple signal before lowering it back down, to the delight of the crowd.

Shea Stadium also hosted the first extra-inning regular season baseball opener played in New York, on March 31, 1998, when the Mets opened their season against their rival Philadelphia Phillies, playing the longest scoreless opening day game in the National League and the longest one in Major League Baseball since . The Mets won the game 1–0 in the bottom of the 14th inning.

During the 1977 New York City blackout the stadium was plunged into darkness at approximately 9:30 p.m. during a game between the Mets and the Chicago Cubs. It occurred during the bottom of the sixth inning, with the Mets losing 2–1 and Lenny Randle at bat. Jane Jarvis, Shea's organist (affectionately known as Shea's "Queen of Melody") played "Jingle Bells" and "White Christmas". The game was eventually completed on September 16, with the Cubs winning 5–2.

Boxing
Shea Stadium held boxing matches in the mid-1960s.

Football

The New York Jets of the American Football League and later, the National Football League played at Shea for 20 seasons, from 1964 through 1983 (excluding their first home game in 1977, played at Giants Stadium). The stadium hosted three Jets playoff games: the American Football League Championship in 1968 (defeating the Oakland Raiders, 27–23), an AFL Divisional Playoff in 1969 (a 13–6 loss to the Kansas City Chiefs) and the 1981 AFC Wild Card Playoff game (lost 31–27 to the Buffalo Bills).

For most of the Jets' tenure at Shea, they were burdened by onerous lease terms imposed at the insistence of the Mets. Until 1978, the Jets could not play their first home game until the Mets' season was finished. For instance, in 1969, the defending Super Bowl champion Jets didn't play a home game until October 20 due to the Mets advancing to (and winning) the World Series.  As a result, the 1969 Jets opened with five consecutive road games, and then played all seven home games in consecutive weeks before closing with two road games. Even after 1978, the Mets' status as Shea's primary tenants would require the Jets to go on long road trips (switching Shea from baseball to football configuration was a complex process involving electrical, plumbing, field, and other similar work). The stadium was also not well maintained in the 1970s. The Jets moved to Giants Stadium for the 1984 season, enticed by the more than 15,000 additional seats there. Fans ripped apart Shea after the last game of the 1983 season, which also was the last game for Hall of Fame quarterback Terry Bradshaw, who threw two touchdown passes to lead the Pittsburgh Steelers to a 34–7 victory. Even the scoreboard operator had a field day, displaying the home team as the "N.J. Jets".

It was at Shea Stadium on December 16, 1973, that O. J. Simpson became the first running back to gain 2,000 yards in a single season (and, to date, the only player to do it in 14 games or fewer). In the 1983 season, a Jets game against the Los Angeles Rams featured an 85-yard touchdown run by rookie Eric Dickerson, as well as a brawl between Rams offensive tackle Jackie Slater and Jets defensive end Mark Gastineau when Slater blindsided Gastineau after the Jet performed his infamous "Sack Dance" over fallen Rams quarterback Vince Ferragamo.

The NFL's New York Giants played their 1975 season at Shea while Giants Stadium was being built. The Giants were  that year (2–5 at Shea). Their coach was Bill Arnsparger and their quarterback was Craig Morton. The Giants played their final five home games of 1973 and all seven in 1974 at the Yale Bowl in New Haven, Connecticut; Yankee Stadium was closed in October 1973 for a massive renovation, which was completed in time for the 1976 baseball season.

On the night of October 9, 1965, Shea Stadium hosted the football rivalry between Army and Notre Dame for the first and only time. The Fighting Irish blanked the Cadets, 17–0, beginning a 15-game winning streak for Notre Dame in the storied series.

In 1966, the Brooklyn Dodgers of the minor Continental Football League unsuccessfully sued the Jets in an attempt to use the stadium; the team wound up playing on Randall's Island and soon folded. In 1974, the New York Stars of the nascent World Football League also made inquiries to play at Shea, whose schedule was already overcrowded by the Mets, Jets and Yankees (and the following year, the Giants; see below). The Stars also moved out to Randall's Island, playing only a handful of games before shifting to Charlotte.

The football field at Shea extended from around home plate to centerfield, with the baseline seating rotating out to fill left and right fields.

Soccer
The first soccer game at Shea Stadium occurred during International Soccer League tournament play on June 17, 1965.

The original New York Cosmos beat the Washington Diplomats, 2–0, in an NASL playoff game at Shea on August 17, 1976.

New York United of the American Soccer League called Shea home in 1980.

Concerts

On Sunday, August 15, 1965, The Beatles opened their 1965 North American tour there to a record audience of 55,600.  "Beatlemania" was at one of its peaks at their Shea concert. Film footage shows many teenagers and women crying, screaming, and even fainting. The crowd noise was such that security guards can be seen covering their ears as the Beatles entered the field. The sound of the crowd was so deafening that none of the Beatles (or anyone else) could hear what they were playing. Nevertheless, it was the first concert to be held at a major stadium and set records for attendance and revenue generation, demonstrating that outdoor concerts on a large scale could be successful and profitable, and led the Beatles to return to Shea for a successful encore on August 23, 1966. The attendance record was broken within the United States by
the Grateful Dead concert at New Jersey Raceway in Englishtown of 107,019 purchases, on September 3, 1977.

The next major music event to play Shea Stadium after the Beatles' successful appearances was the Summer Festival for Peace on August 6, 1970. It was a day-long fundraiser, which featured many of the era's biggest-selling and seminal rock, folk, blues and jazz performers including: Janis Joplin, Paul Simon, Creedence Clearwater Revival, Steppenwolf, The James Gang, Miles Davis, Tom Paxton, John Sebastian, and others.

The next music show at Shea Stadium was the historic concert by Grand Funk Railroad in 1971, which broke the Beatles' then-record for fastest ticket sales. Humble Pie was the opening band. The same filmmakers for the documentary of the Rolling Stones concert at Altamont were commissioned to film it, but to date, a final film has not been released.

The stadium subsequently hosted numerous concerts, including Jethro Tull with opening act Robin Trower in July 1976 (billed as Tull v. Boeing because of the proximity to LaGuardia Airport), The Who with opening acts The Clash and David Johansen in October 1982 (two concerts), and Simon & Garfunkel in August 1983. On August 18, 1983, The Police played in front of 70,000 fans at Shea, a concert that the band's singer and bassist Sting described as "like playing the top of Everest", and announced near the end of the concert: "We'd like to thank the Beatles for lending us their stadium." The Rolling Stones performed at Shea for a six-night run in October 1989, and Elton John and Eric Clapton played a concert in August 1992. Bruce Springsteen and the E Street Band ended The Rising Tour with three concerts at Shea in early October 2003, with Bob Dylan making a special guest appearance at the final show to perform "Highway 61 Revisited" with Springsteen.

The last concert event was a two-night engagement by Billy Joel on July 16 and 18, 2008. The concert was dubbed The Last Play at Shea, and featured many special guest appearances, including former Beatle Paul McCartney who closed the second show with an emotional rendition of the Beatles classic "Let It Be". Other artists that joined Joel on stage for the shows were former Shea performer Roger Daltrey of The Who, Tony Bennett, Don Henley, John Mayer, John Mellencamp, Garth Brooks, and Steven Tyler of Aerosmith. The concert was the subject of a documentary film of the same name, which is used along with Shea's history to tell the story of changes in American suburban life.

Pete Flynn was a Shea groundskeeper who did the improbable by driving the Beatles from the stage to a centerfield gate in 1965, then driving Paul McCartney from the stadium's rear entrance to the stage to perform at Billy Joel's "Last Play at Shea" concert 43 years later in 2008.

Other events
The 1978 International Convention of Jehovah's Witnesses was held at Shea Stadium from July 12 to 16, 1978.
During his tour of America in October 1979, Pope John Paul II was also among those hosted by Shea Stadium. On the morning of the Pontiff's visit, Shea Stadium was awash in torrential rain, causing ankle-deep mud puddles, and threatened to ruin the event. But as the Popemobile entered the stadium, the rain stopped although the deep mud remained.

On December 9, 1979, as part of the halftime show of a National Football League game between the New York Jets and New England Patriots, a model airplane group put on a remote control airplane display. The grand finale was a remote control airplane, weighing 40 lbs, made to look like a red flying lawnmower. The pilot lost control of the airplane, and it crashed into the stands, hitting Kevin Rourke, of Lynn, Massachusetts and John Bowen of Nashua, New Hampshire. Both suffered serious head injuries; Rourke survived but Bowen died four days later.

Between 1972 and 1980, Shea also hosted a Showdown at Shea event three separate times, by the then World Wrestling Federation. In 1980, it hosted a simulcast of the first fight between Roberto Duran and Sugar Ray Leonard, won by Duran.

From 1970 to 1987, the Cape Cod Baseball League (CCBL) played its annual all-star game at various major league stadiums. The games were interleague contests between the CCBL and the Atlantic Collegiate Baseball League (ACBL). The 1982 and 1986 games were played at Shea. The 1986 contest starred game MVP and future Cincinnati Reds all-star pitcher Jack Armstrong.

In the aftermath of the September 11 attacks, the stadium became a staging area for rescuers, its parking lots filled with food, water, medical supplies, even makeshift shelters where relief workers could sleep. Ten days later Shea reopened for the first post-attack sporting event in New York where the Mets beat the Braves, behind a dramatic home run by Mets catcher Mike Piazza.

In popular culture
In the television serial drama Mad Men, the main character, Don Draper, has his secretary buy a pair of tickets for the Beatles' concert at Shea Stadium in 1965.

The ballpark was parodied as being "named after the Cuban guerilla leader Che Stadium" in The Rutles film All You Need is Cash.

Shea Stadium was parodied as Spray Stadium in an episode of Batman '66.

In 1987, Marvel Comics rented Shea Stadium to re-enact the wedding of Peter Parker/Spider-Man and Mary Jane Watson.

In the 2007 documentary series Seven Ages of Rock, Shea Stadium was named the most hallowed venue in all of rock music.

In Godzilla: The Series, the stadium was destroyed in a fight between Godzilla and Crackler.

Shea Stadium was used for filming the 1973 movie Bang The Drum Slowly starring Robert De Niro and Michael Moriarty and the 1978 film The Wiz. In the latter film, the exterior pedestrian ramps were used for a motorcycle chase scene with Michael Jackson and Diana Ross.

A scene in the 2002 movie Two Weeks Notice takes place at Shea.

In Men in Black, a Mets game at Shea was featured in the film, with outfielder Bernard Gilkey dropping a fly ball after being distracted by an alien spacecraft in the sky. Shea was also featured in Men in Black 3 which is where K and J intercept Griffin and the ArcNet in 1969 before Boris the Animal can capture it.

Shea Stadium was also the setting for two episodes of The King of Queens: "Doug Out" (1999) and "Catching Hell" (2005).

The exterior part of the Stadium is featured in the 2006 videogame Driver: Parallel Lines.

1975: Four teams, one year and one stadium
The Mets, Yankees, Jets and Giants all called Shea home in 1975, the only time in professional sports history that two baseball teams and two football teams shared the same facility in the same year.

As Yankee Stadium was being renovated and Giants Stadium was nearing completion, there were scheduling clashes between the four teams once the calendar turned to September. Neither the Jets nor the Giants could play "home" games at Shea Stadium until the baseball season ended for the Mets and Yankees. The matter was simplified when neither baseball team qualified for the postseason; still, there was a two-week overlap as the NFL season started on Sunday, September 21 while the MLB campaign ended on Sunday, September 28. This meant the Jets opened at home on Sunday, October 5, the third week of the season, and the Giants on Sunday, October 12, the season's fourth week. It also meant that the Giants and Jets had to play a combined 14 home games in the final 12 weeks of the 14-week NFL season. To do so, the Giants played two Saturday afternoon home games, neither of which were televised, and both of which were played the day before a Jets' Sunday home game. New York football fans thus enjoyed either the Jets or the Giants hosting a Sunday home game every weekend from October 5 through December 21. Shea wound up hosting all four teams on consecutive Sundays: Mets (September 21), Yankees (September 28), Jets (October 5) and Giants (October 12).

In total, the "Big Four" drew 3,738,546 customers to Shea: 1,730,566 by the Mets (76 home dates); 1,288,048 by the Yankees (71 home dates); 361,102 by the Jets (seven home games) and 358,830 by the Giants (also seven). Having both the Giants and Jets share Shea Stadium for one season foreshadowed what was to come in the future with the Meadowlands (a.k.a. Giants Stadium), after the Jets left Flushing Meadows for New Jersey following the 1983 NFL season.

Features

Design
Shea was a circular stadium, with the grandstand forming about two-thirds of a circle around the field and ending a short distance beyond the foul lines. The remainder of the perimeter was mostly empty space beyond the outfield fences. This space was occupied by the bullpens, scoreboards, and a section of bleachers beyond the left field fence. The stadium boasted 54 restrooms, 21 escalators, seats for 57,343 fans (although as seating configuration changed constantly over the life of the stadium, that number varied often, dropping to 55,601 by the 1986 World Series, and then increased again over following years to between approximately 56,000 and 57,000, until its closing), and a massive 86' x 175' scoreboard. Also, rather than the standard light towers, Shea featured lamps along its upper reaches. Some deemed Shea a showplace, praised for its convenience, even its "elegance". The stadium's scoreboard in right field, one of the largest in MLB when it opened, weighed over 60 tons. One of its distinctive features was a giant rearview slide projector screen on the top center of the scoreboard; it was intended to display a picture of the current player at bat (a groundbreaking innovation at the time); however, due to lighting issues (it only worked at night when the light was really low; during day games, the picture would not show up at all), it was not used very often and was eventually covered with a giant Mets logo (or a Jets logo when they played).

The stadium was located close to LaGuardia Airport. For many years, interruptions for planes flying overhead were common at Shea; the noise was so loud that radio and television broadcasts could not be heard.  Players would usually ask for time during noisy flight approaches and takeoffs.

Shea was originally designed with two motor-operated stands that allow the field level seats to rotate on underground tracks, allowing the stadium to be converted between a baseball and an American football/soccer configuration. In 1982, a new Mitsubishi DiamondVision screen was installed in left field. After the New York Jets football team moved to Giants Stadium in East Rutherford, New Jersey in 1984, the Mets took over operation of the stadium and retrofitted it for exclusive baseball use. As part of the refitting, Shea Stadium's exterior was painted blue and neon signs of baseball player silhouettes were added to the windscreens prior to the 1988 season. Around the same time, the original scoreboard was removed, and a new one installed in its place (fitting into the shell left behind by the old one) allowing for a much greater space for information and entertainment after the original message board above the main scoreboard was covered up by the Budweiser advertisement in 1982. Also, after years of injuries to players crashing into the wooden outfield wall, most notably to 1973 star player Rusty Staub, where one injury caused a dislocated shoulder and forced him to miss or play severely injured during that Championship Season, the original wall finally had padding added to it, as most in baseball already did, greatly reducing injuries to outfielders.

Banks of ramps that provided access from the ground to the upper levels were built around the outside circumference of the stadium. The ramps were not walled in and were visible from outside the stadium. The ramps were originally partly covered with many rectangular panels in blue and orange, the Mets' colors. These panels can be seen in the 1970s movie The Wiz, which used the exterior pedestrian ramps for a motorcycle chase scene with Michael Jackson and Diana Ross. The 1960s-style decorations were removed in 1980. The banks of ramps resulted in the outer wall of the stadium jutting out where the banks existed.

The design also allowed for Shea Stadium to be expandable to 90,000 seats, simply by completely enclosing the grandstand. It was also designed to be later enclosed by a dome if warranted. In March 1965, a plan was formally announced to add a glass dome and add 15,000 seats. The Mets strongly objected to the proposal. The idea was later dropped after engineering studies concluded that the stadium's foundation would be unable to support the weight of the dome.

The distances to the right and left field foul poles were initially both . There was a horizontal orange line that determined where a batted ball was a home run or still in play.

Originally, all of the seats were wooden, with each level having a different color. The field boxes were yellow, the loge level seats were brown, the mezzanine seats were blue, and the upper deck seats were green. Each level above the field level was divided into box seats below the entrance/exit portals and reserved seats above the portals. The box seats were a darker shade than the reserved seats. The game ticket was the same color as the seat that it represented, and the signs in the lobby for that section were the same color as the seat and the ticket. Before the 1980 baseball season, they were replaced with red (upper deck), green (mezzanine), blue (loge), and orange (field level) plastic seats.

Unlike Yankee Stadium, Shea was built on an open field, so there was no need to have it conform to the surrounding streets.

Before Shea Stadium closed in 2008, it was the only stadium in the major leagues with orange foul poles. This tradition is carried on at Citi Field as the foul poles there are the same color.

After the Jets left Shea, the exterior of the stadium was painted blue and white, two of the Mets' team colors.

In 2003, large murals celebrating the Mets' two world championships were added, covering the two ends of the grandstand.

With its refurbishment in 1988, the scoreboard was topped by a representation of the New York Skyline, a prominent part of the team logo. After the September 11 terrorist attacks, the Twin Towers of the World Trade Center were kept unlit, with a red-white-and-blue ribbon placed over them. The scoreboard was demolished in October 2008, but the skyline was preserved and is now located on the Shake Shack in Citi Field's "Taste Of The City" food court behind the giant scoreboard in center field.

During the 2007 and 2008 seasons, the construction of Citi Field was visible beyond the left and center field walls of Shea.

From 1973 to 1979, fans could estimate the distance of home run balls, since there were several signs beyond the outfield wall giving the distance in feet from home plate, in addition to the nine markers within the field.

Home Run Apple

The Home Run Apple came out of a magic hat after every Mets home run at Shea Stadium. It was first installed in May 1980 as a symbol of the Mets' advertising slogan "The Magic Is Back!" (the hat originally said "Mets Magic" in script but was changed in the mid-1980s to a simple "Home Run" in block capital letters). A bigger apple was placed in center field at Citi Field. The original apple was installed inside Citi Field's bullpen gate and was visible from outside, on 126th Street. In 2010, the original Shea apple was relocated outside the Citi Field, in front of the Jackie Robinson Rotunda.

Seating capacity

Homages
Four players in the National League named their children after Shea Stadium.
Former Atlanta Braves third baseman Chipper Jones named his second son Shea after Jones' success in Shea Stadium against the Mets; he hit 19 home runs there, more than any other road park.
Former Cincinnati Reds shortstop Barry Larkin named his eldest daughter Brielle D'Shea, as he enjoyed playing at Shea Stadium.
Former Houston Astros third baseman Gary Cooper named his youngest daughter Shea. He also named his son Camden after Camden Yards in Baltimore.
Former New York Mets third baseman David Wright named his first daughter Olivia Shea. Wright spent his entire baseball career playing for the Mets.

Actor Kevin James, a devoted Mets fan, named his youngest daughter Shea Joelle.

References

External links

 Ballpark Digest Visit to Shea Stadium
 Shea Stadium Opening Day 2006 Photo
 A Photographic Documentary of the Final Summer of Shea

 ESPN: "Be it ever so humble, there's no place like Shea"
 Corey Kilgannon (September 30, 2008), "In Mudville, Queens, Shea Scavengers Hunt Soggy Discarded Relics", The New York Times, page B3, retrieved on October 3, 2008
 James Barron (October 11, 2008), "With Stadiums Going, Going, Ashes May Be Gone", The New York Times, Page A17, retrieved on October 12, 2008 [Relatives grieve over ashes smuggled into and left under or over Shea and Yankee stadiums.]
 Pics from the 3B Side, 2008 Season

 
 

 
 

 
 

 
 

 
 

 
Sports venues completed in 1964
Sports venues demolished in 2009
American Football League venues
American football venues in New York (state)
Baseball venues in New York (state)
Multi-purpose stadiums in the United States
Defunct National Football League venues
Defunct college football venues
Defunct college baseball venues in the United States 
American football venues in New York City
Defunct Major League Baseball venues
Baseball venues in New York City
Boxing venues in New York City
New York Mets stadiums
New York Jets stadiums
New York Yankees stadiums
New York Giants stadiums
Robert Moses projects
Defunct American football venues in the United States
Defunct baseball venues in the United States
Defunct multi-purpose stadiums in the United States  
Former sports venues in New York City
Demolished sports venues in New York (state)
Demolished buildings and structures in Queens, New York
Flushing, Queens
Flushing Meadows–Corona Park
1964 establishments in New York City
2009 disestablishments in New York (state)